The 2015 Maui Invitational Tournament was an early-season college basketball tournament that was played, for the 32nd time, from November 13 to November 25, 2015.  The tournament began in 1984, and was part of the 2015–16 NCAA Division I men's basketball season.  The Championship Round was played at the Lahaina Civic Center in Maui, Hawaii from November 23 to 25.

Brackets

Opening round
The opening round was played on November 13–16 at various sites around the country.

November 13
Kansas 109, Northern Colorado 72 in Lawrence, Kansas
UNLV 74, Cal Poly 72 in Paradise, Nevada
Vanderbilt 80, Austin Peay 41 in Nashville, Tennessee
Wake Forest 78, UMBC 73 in Winston-Salem, North Carolina

November 15
UCLA 88, Cal Poly 83 in Los Angeles, California

November 16
Indiana 102, Austin Peay 76 in Bloomington, Indiana
St. John's 75, UMBC 53 in New York City

Regional round

*Games played at Bank of Colorado Arena in Greeley, Colorado

Championship round
The Championship round was played from November 23–25 at Lahaina Civic Center in Maui, Hawaii.

References

Maui Invitational Tournament
Maui Invitational
Maui Invitational